Leshi Township or Layshi Township is a mountainous township located within the Naga Self-Administered Zone of Sagaing Region, Myanmar. It is also part of the Naga Self-Administered Zone. The principal town is Leshi.

There is a major road under construction down from Lashi to the Chindwin River at Tamanthi in Homalin Township.

In 2010, a portion of Hkamti Township in the Naga Hills, including the Naga village of Yawpami, was transferred to Leshi Township, to facilitate the creation of the Naga Self-Administered Zone.

Communities
Among the towns and villages in Leshi Township are Amimi (Ahmimi), Heirnkut (Heinkwet), Kholar, Naungkatiat (Naungkantlant), Ngacham (Ngakyan), Pansat (Panset), Sainolin (Saungnoelin), Saungkin (Sonkin), Somra (Sumnarar), Tsera and Yawpami (Rawparmee).

Languages
Various Ao languages and Tangkhulic languages are spoken in Leshi Township.
Somra language
Akyaung Ari language
Goga (Koki) language
Long Phuri language
Makury language
Para language

Notes

External links
 "Lashe Google Satellite Map" Maplandia

Townships of Sagaing Region